Two Souls may refer to:

Culture
Two-Spirits, an umbrella term sometimes used for what was once commonly known as berdaches
The Two Souls of Socialism, a socialist pamphlet that posits a fundamental division in socialist thought and action

Media
Two Souls in One, a debut album by American saxophonist George Braith recorded in 1963
Beyond: Two Souls, a 2013 interactive drama action-adventure video game